Georges Candilis (29 March 1913 – 10 May 1995) was a Greek-French architect and urbanist.

Biography 

Born in Azerbaijan, he moved to Greece and graduated from the Polytechnic School of Athens between 1931 and 1936. In 1933 he met Le Corbusier during his studies, at CIAM IV, as a result he is assigned the direction of ASCORAL in 1943. In 1945, he moved to France in along with many other Greek intellectuals on the Mataroa voyage. There he worked for André Lurçat and Le Corbusier in their office, and was involved in the construction of the Unité d'Habitation de Marseille. Together with Shadrach Woods and Henri Piot he was engaged in the search for solutions in the problem of the rapidly urbanizing science of Islamic countries, combining low-cost construction and the use of traditional architectural elements. They developed cross-ventilated buildings with courtyards, in Oran, Algeria and Casablanca. In 1951, together with Shadrach Woods and engineer Henri Piot they became the leaders of ATBAT-Africa, in Tangier, Morocco, a workshop conceived as a research center, where architects engineers and technicians worked in an interdisciplinary way, closed in 1952 due to the political tension of the time.

In 1954 he returned to Paris and opened his own office, together with engineers Pablo Dony and Piot and architect Alexis Josic and Woods. The office was aimed at reducing the costs of building three-bedroom apartments. The office had important projects such as the extension of Bagnols-sur-Cèze (1956) and the expansion design of the city of Le Mirail (1961) and Toulouse (1970). In 1955 he founded a firm together with Woods and Josic. The partnership was dissolved in 1969, from which time he continued to work as an architect and urban planner, undertaking projects in tourist-centric regions and in the Middle East ranging from housing to schools and vacation homes. He remained in teaching until after the student riots of May 1968 and was a guest lecturer at several schools of architecture in France and abroad. In 1977 he published Batir la Vie. He died in Paris on May 10, 1995.

Candilis gained notoriety from a number of developments he designed with Alexis Josic and Shadrach Woods, including Le Mirail, Toulouse and Carriere Centrale in Casablanca.

Candilis was also a founding member of Team 10.

References

Further reading
 Jürgen Joedicke, Candilis, Josic, Woods, une décennie d'architecture et d'urbanisme, éd. Eyrolles, 1968.
 Pierre Granveaud, « Georges Candilis » in Dictionnaire des architectes, éd. Encyclopædia Universalis-Albin Michel, 1999, p. 166-168.
 Massimiliano Savorra, Il Mediterraneo per tutti. Georges Candilis e il turismo per il Grande Numero,  in A. Maglio, F. Mangone, A. Pizza (a cura di), Immaginare il Mediterraneo. Architettura, arti, fotografia, Artstudiopaparo, Napoli 2017, pp. 235-245 –

External links

 
 Bobigny HLM Low Cost Housing in Paris by Woods, Candilis & Josic (with photos and drawings)

1913 births
1995 deaths
People from Baku Governorate
French people of Greek descent
Academic staff of the École des Beaux-Arts
Soviet emigrants to Greece
Greek emigrants to France
Architects from Baku
20th-century French architects
Greek urban planners
National Technical University of Athens alumni
20th-century Greek architects
Architects from Athens